Costel Alexe (born 20 August 1983) is a Romanian politician. He served as Minister for Environment, Waters and Forests in the first and second cabinet of Prime Minister Ludovic Orban. He resigned after being elected president of the Iaşi County Council. Mircea Fechet was appointed as his successor.

, he is being investigated for alleged bribery and incitement to embezzlement.

References 

Living people
1983 births
People from Adjud
21st-century Romanian politicians
National Liberal Party (Romania) politicians
Members of the Chamber of Deputies (Romania)
Councillors in Romania
Romanian Ministers of the Environment
Alexandru Ioan Cuza University alumni